Kingpin is an American crime drama television series which debuted on the NBC network in the U.S. and CTV in Canada on February 2, 2003, and lasted 6 episodes. The series detailed a Mexican drug trafficker named Miguel Cadena (Yancey Arias) and his family life. Low ratings and the network's discomfort with airing a show with a drug trafficker protagonist resulted in the show's cancellation. Commercials on NBC featured the song "Más" by the Mexican band Kinky, which also featured in the series.

Cast
 Yancey Arias as Miguel Cadena
 Sheryl Lee as Marlene McDillon Cadena
 Rubén Carbajal as Joey Cadena
 Bobby Cannavale as Chato Cadena
 Angela Alvarado Rosa as Delia Flores
 Brian Benben as Dr. Heywood Klein
 Shay Roundtree as Junie Gatling
 Neko Parham as Shawn Williams
 Elpidia Carrillo as Lupita
 Eduardo Palomo as Capt. Lazareno
 Sean Young as Lorelei Klein
 Toy Connor as Sheronda Clifford

Crew
The series was created by writer David Mills. Mills also served as the head writer, show runner and an executive producer. Aaron Spelling and E. Duke Vincent were the series other executive producers. James L. Conway and Jonathan Levin were consulting producers for the series. Daniel Sackheim was a co-executive producer and regular director. Doug Palau was a supervising producer and writer for the series. Paul Cajero was the series line producer.

The series other writers were Lloyd Rose, Diego Gutierrez, Maria Elena Rodriguez, Floyd Salas and Susie Putnam.
The series other directors were Allen Coulter, James Hayman, Michael M. Robin and Peter O'Fallon.

Episodes

References

External links
 

2000s American crime drama television series
2003 American television series debuts
2003 American television series endings
Television series by CBS Studios
Television series by Spelling Television
Television series by Universal Television
Works about Mexican drug cartels
 Television shows set in New Mexico